Terror (Oka Polisodi Katha) is a 2016 Indian Telugu-language action thriller film written and directed by Satish Kasetty. Produced by Shaikk Mastan, the film features Srikanth in the lead role with Nikita, Nassar, Ravi Varma, Kota Srinivasa Rao and Prudhviraj in supporting roles. The film revolves around honest police officer Vijay who finds out about an imminent terror attack on the city, and has to act before time runs out, despite the involvement of politicians and some of those from his own department.

Terror was released worldwide on 26 February 2016 to positive critical acclaim. Following the positive reception, the film gained more screens and eventually turned out to be a box office hit.

Cast
Srikanth as Vijay
Ravi Varma as Mujeeb
Kota Srinivasa Rao as home minister
Prudhviraj as MLA Ravi
Vinay Varma as DCP V. Rathod
Nikita as Vijay's wife
Nassar as Vijay's father
Sudha as Vijay's mother
Uttej as Shiva
Priyadarshi Pullikonda as terrorist
Nalamada Uttam Kumar Reddy in cameo as chief minister
Rajesh Touchriver
Rama Rao Jadhav as tenthouse owner
 Seshagiri Rao T as Business Man

Soundtrack
Songs composed by Sai Karthik.

"O Lala O Lala"
"Dil Ka Diwana"
"Okkasari"

Release and reception
Terror was released on 26 February 2016 across Telangana and Andhra Pradesh, and received mostly positive reviews.

References

External links

2010s Telugu-language films
2016 action thriller films
Indian action thriller films
Films shot in Telangana
Fictional portrayals of the Telangana Police
Films about police officers
Films about terrorism in India
Films scored by Sai Karthik
Films about jihadism
Films about Islamic terrorism
Films about corruption in India
Indian political drama films